MM Lawrence is an Indian politician and a member of the Communist Party of India Marxist (CPIM).

Lawrence served as a member of the party's central committee until 1998. He was a convenor of the Left Democratic Front in Kerala. From 1980 to 1984 he served as member of parliament for the Idukki constituency.

Following his departure from the CPIM central committee, he took roles at a local level in Ernakulam district where he was also leader of the Centre of Indian Trade Unions  (CITU) and president of Cochin Port Labour Union.

References 

Communist Party of India (Marxist) politicians from Kerala
India MPs 1980–1984